Front Page Magazine may refer to:

FrontPage Magazine
Front Page (newsmagazine)